John Martin Bonfield (1 May 1915 – 9 January 1976) was a British trade unionist.

Bonfield grew up in Hitchin in Hertfordshire before becoming a printer.  He joined the Typographical Association, becoming its National Assistant Secretary in 1948, then General President in 1955 and General Secretary in 1957.  That year, he was also elected to the executive of the International Graphical Federation, becoming president in 1967.  In 1961, he was also elected as President of the Printing and Kindred Trades Federation.

Under Bonfield's leadership, the Typographical Association merged with the London Typographical Society to form the National Graphical Association.  Bonfield became joint general secretary, with Robert Willis, working alone from 1965 to 1967 while Willis took a leave of absence, and serving permanently alone from 1969, when Willis retired.

Bonfield retired from most of his trade union posts in 1974, although he remained general secretary of the NGA, and also on the Eastern Electricity Board, a part-time post he had held since 1968.  He died early in 1976.

References

1915 births
1976 deaths
General Secretaries of the National Graphical Association
People from Hitchin